Kannada films of 2000
Kannada films of 2001
Kannada films of 2002
Kannada films of 2003
Kannada films of 2004
Kannada films of 2005
Kannada films of 2006
Kannada films of 2007
Kannada films of 2008
Kannada films of 2009
Kannada films of 2010

2000s
Lists of 2000s films
Films, Kannada